HNW may refer to:

 HNW, an American marketing firm
 Hamilton West railway station, in South Lanarkshire, Scotland
 Hannu, majordomo to Menuhotep III
 Hennu, a symbol of the god Seker of Memphis
 Hidayat Nur Wahid, an Indonesian politician
 High-net-worth individual
 Harsh noise wall, a subgenre of noise music